Ajay Devgn Films is an Indian film production and distribution company established by actor Ajay Devgn & his father Veeru Devgan in 2000. Based in Mumbai, it mainly produces and distributes Hindi films.

In 2000, ADFF released its first film, Raju Chacha. The film starred Devgn and Kajol. Raju Chacha received mixed reviews but grossed  at the box office.

In 2015, Devgn started a visual effects company, NY VFXWAALA.

History
In 2000, ADF released its first film, Raju Chacha. The film starred Devgn and Kajol.

In 2008, Devgn co-produced the drama U Me Aur Hum, which marked his directorial debut. Devgn also played the lead role in the film, sharing the screen again with Kajol. The film was written by Devgn himself and three other writers.

In 2009, Devgn released and acted in his home production All the Best: Fun Begins, which was directed by Rohit Shetty and also starring, Sanjay Dutt, Fardeen Khan, Bipasha Basu and Mugdha Godse. The film was released on 16 October 2009. It was rated a hit in India, and is the ninth highest grossing Bollywood film of 2009.

In 2012, Devgn starred in Rohit Shetty's romantic action comedy film Bol Bachchan, which was a joint production by Shree Ashtavinayak Cine Vision Ltd  and also featured Abhishek Bachchan, Asin and Prachi Desai in lead roles. The film was released on 6 July 2012 in around 2,575 screens worldwide with 2,700 prints. It received mixed reviews from critics but enjoyed a good opening at the box office. The film supposedly created a record for its advance bookings. Bol Bachchan has become one of the highest-grossing Bollywood film of all time in India. Box Office India declared the film as a "hit" and it grossed  worldwide.

That same year Devgn starred in Ashwni Dhir's romantic action comedy film, Son of Sardaar, which was a joint production by Viacom 18 Motion Pictures, also featuring Sanjay Dutt, Sonakshi Sinha and Juhi Chawla in lead roles. The film was released on 13 November 2012. Whilst having competition with the Yash Raj film Jab Tak Hai Jaan, Son of Sardaar managed to do very well at the box office worldwide. Box Office India rated Son of Sardaar as a hit, and an average grosser in the overseas markets. It went on to gross  worldwide.

In 2014, ADFF produced Singham Returns starring Devgn and Kareena Kapoor. In 2016, Devgn produced and starred in Shivaay which is the most expensive film of his production company to date.

In June 2017, it was reported that ADFF will make a television serial based on the life of Baba Ramdev and his success with Patanjali Ayurved.

In late December 2017, ADFF collaborated with Fox Star Studios to produce Total Dhamaal starring Devgn, Riteish Deshmukh, Arshad Warsi, Jaaved Jaaferi, Madhuri Dixit and Anil Kapoor.

In January 2018, ADFF announced film Helicopter Eela that has his wife Kajol in the lead role.

In December 2021, ADFF announced the film Velle that has Sunny Deol's son Karan Deol in the lead role as Rahul, Anya Singh as Riya, also supporting actors Abhay Deol as Rishi Singh, Mouni Roy as Rohini, Zakhir Hussain as R. S. (Riya's father), Vishesh Tiwari as Raju and Savant Singh Premi as Rambo.

Production

Films

VFX

NY VFXWALA
In October 2015, Devgn established a visual effects company called, NY VFXWAALA, which was named after his kids, Nysa and Yug. Apart from home productions, his VFX team have been involved with many major films, such as Prem Ratan Dhan Payo, Tamasha, Bajirao Mastani, Mersal, Dilwale, Force 2, and Simmba. The company won the Best Special Effects award at the 64th National Film Awards for the film Shivaay (2016).

Television

References

External links
Official Website
YouTube Channel

Ajay Devgn
Film production companies based in Mumbai
Indian companies established in 2000
Hindi cinema